The sralai is a Cambodian wind instrument that uses a quadruple reed to produce sound. The instrument is used in the pinpeat orchestra, where it is the only wind instrument. The set of quadruple reeds are made of palm leaf. The bore of the instrument is not evenly bored, but "slightly conical." Its cousin, the Western oboe, has a double reed and a conical bore. The pinpeat instruments tune to the sralai's pitch, and the player must learn circular breathing to play continuously without stopping for breath. The sralai is very similar in construction and playing technique to the Thai pi.

See also
Shehnai  quadrupal-reed instrument used throughout the Indian subcontinent

References

External links
Sound sample of the Thai equivalent (the pi).
Sralai "oboe" page from Cambodian with Dr. Sam-Ang Sam, Ethnomusicology OnLine
Sralai audio

Cambodian musical instruments
Quadruple-reed instruments